Miguel Antonio Vargas (born November 17, 1999) is a Cuban professional baseball infielder for the Los Angeles Dodgers of Major League Baseball (MLB). He made his MLB debut in 2022.

Career
Vargas signed with the Los Angeles Dodgers as an international free agent in September 2017. He spent his first professional season in 2018 with the Arizona League Dodgers, Ogden Raptors and Great Lakes Loons.

Vargas played 2019 with Great Lakes and Rancho Cucamonga Quakes. He did not play a minor league game in 2020 since the season was cancelled due to the COVID-19 pandemic. He started 2021 with Great Lakes before being promoted to the Tulsa Drillers. Between the two teams, he appeared in 120 games and batted .319 with 23 homers and 76 RBI. The Dodgers honored him by awarding him the organizations Branch Rickey Minor League Player of the Year Award. He was selected as a post-season Double-A Central all-star. He was promoted to the Triple-A Oklahoma City Dodgers to begin the 2022 season and was selected to represent the Dodgers at the 2022 All-Star Futures Game.  He played in 113 games for Oklahoma City, batting .304 with 17 homers and 72 RBIs.

The Dodgers promoted Vargas to the major leagues for the first time on August 2, 2022. He made his first appearance the following day, against the San Francisco Giants as the starting designated hitter. In his first at-bat he hit a ground-rule double off Giants' starter Alex Cobb. On September 24, 2022, Vargas hit his first MLB home run off Jordan Montgomery of the St. Louis Cardinals. In 18 games with the Dodgers, he hit .170 with eight RBI while playing first base and left field as well as designated hitter.

Personal life
His father, Lázaro Vargas, played baseball for the Cuban national team.

References

External links

Living people
1999 births
Major League Baseball players from Cuba
Major League Baseball infielders
Los Angeles Dodgers players
Industriales de La Habana players
Arizona League Dodgers players
Ogden Raptors players
Great Lakes Loons players
Rancho Cucamonga Quakes players
Tulsa Drillers players
Oklahoma City Dodgers players